Roger Rinderknecht (born 4 May 1981 in Winterthur) is a Swiss racing cyclist who represents Switzerland in BMX and mountain bike racing. He was selected to represent Switzerland at the 2012 Summer Olympics in the men's BMX event where he reached the semi-finals.  He had previously reached the semi-finals at the 2008 Summer Olympics.

Rinderknecht was appointed as a member of the inaugural UCI Athletes' Commission in 2011.

References

External links

1981 births
Living people
Cyclists at the 2008 Summer Olympics
Cyclists at the 2012 Summer Olympics
Olympic cyclists of Switzerland
Swiss male cyclists
BMX riders
Swiss mountain bikers
People from Winterthur
UCI Mountain Bike World Champions (men)
Sportspeople from the canton of Zürich